Mikhaylovsky District is an administrative and municipal district (raion), one of the twenty in Amur Oblast, Russia. Its administrative center is the rural locality (a selo) of Poyarkovo. Population:  17,081 (2002 Census);  The population of Poyarkovo accounts for 46.8% of the district's total population.

References

Notes

Sources

Districts of Amur Oblast